Be Careful What You Wish For... is the first album by Gabby La La, the multi-instrumentalist on Les Claypool's Prawn Song record label.

The album is written almost like children's music, using themes such as backpacks, elves and pirates.  The overall sound seems to pay homage to the sound of an off-key circus calliope.  Her range of instruments include a sitar, accordion, toy piano, and ukulele.  Les Claypool produces and provides bass, drums and percussion.

Track listing

Personnel
 Gabby La La – sitar, ukulele, accordion, guitar, theremin, toy piano, lead vocals
 Les Claypool – bass guitar, upright bass, drums, percussion

Production
 Les Claypool – producer, arranger, engineer
 Stephen Marcussen – mastering
 Jesse Rice – project supervisor
 Derek Walls – assistant
 Jay Blakesberg – photographer

References

2005 debut albums
Gabby La La albums
Prawn Song Records albums